Charles Blunt (born 1951) is an Australian businessman.

Charles Blunt may also refer to:
Sir Charles Blunt, 3rd Baronet (1731–1802) of the Blunt baronets
Sir Charles Blunt, 4th Baronet (1775–1840), British Member of Parliament
Sir Charles Blunt, 6th Baronet (1810–1890) of the Blunt baronets

See also
Charles Blount (disambiguation)
Blunt (surname)